Dhanush Babu is an Indian speed skater. Most recently, Babu represented India in the 2019 World Roller Games held in Spain from 4 to 14 July 2019. He was the first Indian to secure an international roller skating medal for India in 2016 at the Asian Speed Skating Championship and to finish fifth in the 500+D event on the track in 2019.

, Babu has won more than 14 gold medals, 10 silver medals, and five bronze medals at India's National Championship. He has won the 100-metre dash in India since it was introduced in 2015, setting a new national record and earning him the nickname "Triple Crown King of the 100-metre". Dhanush has been named national champion and India's best skater six times.

He was conferred with the Karnataka Kreeda Ratna Award in 2018 by Karnataka Government Chief Minister Siddaramaiah for outstanding achievement in national sports. Dhanush is coached by his father Balaji Babu.

Early life and education 

Dhanush Babu, originally from Bangalore, Karnataka, India, started skating in 1999 when he was four years old. He graduated from Carmel High School and has represented India more than 15 times in national and international speed skating competitions. His first National Championship was in 2002 at Vishakapatnam, where he won one silver and one bronze medal.

Competitions

Event specialty and performance 

 Men's 100m sprint road
 Men's 200m time trial road
 Men's 500m sprint piste
 Men's 1 lap circuit

See also 

 Inline Skating
 List of Indian skaters

References 

1995 births
Living people
Sportspeople from Bangalore
Indian male speed skaters
Inline speed skaters